Favartia massemeni is a species of sea snail, a marine gastropod mollusc in the family Muricidae, the murex snails or rock snails.

Description
The length of the shell attains 18 mm.

Distribution
This marine species occurs off French Guiana and Eastern Brazil.

References

 Merle, D. & Garrigues, B., 2008. New muricid species (Mollusca, Gastropoda) from French Guiana. Zoosystema 30(2): 517-526

External links
 

Favartia
Gastropods described in 2008